Joe Gqabi District Municipality is one of the seven districts of Eastern Cape province of South Africa. The seat of Joe Gqabi is Barkly East. The majority of its 349,768 people speak IsiXhosa (2011 census).

Before 1 February 2010 it was known as the Ukhahlamba District Municipality; its name was changed in recognition of Joe Gqabi (1929–1981), an African National Congress member who was a journalist for the New Age, a member of the Umkhonto we Sizwe, and one of the Pretoria Twelve.

Geography

Local municipalities
The district contains the following local municipalities:

Neighbours
Joe Gqabi is surrounded by the following districts:

Demographics
The following statistics are from the 2011 census:

Gender

Ethnic group

Age

Politics

Election results
Election results for Joe Gqabi (prev. Ukhahlamba) in the South African general election, 2004. 
 Population 18 and over: 180 079 [52.76% of total population]
 Total votes: 114 530 [33.55% of total population]
 Voting % estimate: 63.60% votes as a % of population 18 and over

References

External links
 Official website

District municipalities of the Eastern Cape
Joe Gqabi District Municipality